The Pacific Telecommunications Council (PTC) is a telecommunications industry non-profit trade association representing wireline, wireless, Internet, and other information, communications, and technology companies across the forty nations that make up the Pacific Rim.  The organization is headquartered in Honolulu, Hawaiʻi and became a 501(c)(3) in 1980. The organization was founded to bring industry, academics, and government together to help create a meeting ground for the exchange of ideas and policies.

History
PTC held what would become its first annual PTC conference in 1979 with the support of IEEE, the University of Hawaii, Hawaiian Telephone Company, and the Alaska Office of Telecommunications. In 1986, the United States Information Agency began providing funding to the PTC to allow greater participation in its programs by telecommunications industry professionals from developing Pacific Rim countries.

The organization held its 44th annual conference , perennially in Waikīkī‬. It is the largest annual exhibition and conference held in Hawaiʻi for the telecommunications industry in the Pacific Rim. Past keynote speakers included Nobuyuki Idei, then-chairman of Sony, Jung-Uck Seo, then-minister of science and technology for South Korea, William Kennard, then-chairman of the FCC, and Mike Roberts, then-president of ICANN.

References

External links

Telecommunications organizations
Trade associations based in the United States
Trade shows in the United States
1979 establishments in the United States
Organizations established in 1979
501(c)(3) organizations
Non-profit organizations based in Hawaii